The 2001 European Fencing Championships were held in Coblenz, Germany. The event took place from 3 to 8 June 2001.

Medal summary

Men's events

Women's events

Medal table

References 
 Results at the European Fencing Confederation

2001
European Fencing Championships
European Fencing Championships
Sport in Koblenz
International fencing competitions hosted by Germany